Golden Chicken (金雞 gam1 gai1) is a 2002 Hong Kong comedy-drama film directed by Samson Chiu starring Sandra Ng and involving cameo appearances from Andy Lau and Eric Tsang.

It was followed by two sequels: Golden Chicken 2 in 2003 and Golden Chicken 3 in 2014.

Synopsis
Kam (Sandra Ng) is a long time Hong-Kong prostitute. When she gets locked inside a cash machine vestibule with a would be thief (Eric Tsang) she relates to him some stories of her life as a prostitute and how she came to enter her profession.

Cast
 Sandra Ng – Kam
 Eric Tsang – James Bong
 Andy Lau – Himself
 Tony Leung Ka-fai – Professor Chan
 Eason Chan – Steely Willy
 Hu Jun – Ip Chi Kon
 Alfred Cheung – Doctor Cheung
 Chapman To – Club owner
 Felix Wong – Richard
 Tiffany Lee Lung-Yee – Kimmy
 Kristal Tin – Kam's mamasan
 Irene Tsu – Kam's aunt

Awards
 22nd Annual Hong Kong Film Awards
 Nomination – Best Picture
 Nomination – Best Actress (Sandra Ng Kwun-Yu)
 Nomination – Best Supporting Actress (Krystal Tin Yui-Lei)
 Nomination – Best Art Direction (Hai Chung-Man and Wong Bing-Yiu)
 Nomination – Best Costume Design (Hai Chung-Man and Dora Ng Lei-Lo)
 40th Annual Golden Horse Awards
 Winner – Best Actress (Sandra Ng Kwun-Yu)
 Winner – Best Art Direction (Hai Chung-Man and Wong Bing-Yiu)
 Winner – Best Makeup and Costume Design (Hai Chung-Man and Dora Ng Lei-Lo)

External links
 
 Entry at lovehkfilm.com
 HK cinemagic entry

2002 films
2002 romantic comedy films
2000s Cantonese-language films
Hong Kong romantic comedy films
Films about prostitution in Hong Kong
Films directed by Samson Chiu
2000s Hong Kong films